Landwehr is a station on the Hamburg-Altona link line and is served by lines S1 and S11 of the Hamburg S-Bahn. Opened in late 1906, the station is situated on the meeting point of the three districts of Borgfelde, Hohenfelde and Eilbek as well as that of the three boroughs of Hamburg-Mitte, Hamburg-Nord and Wandsbek.

History  
The station was opened on 5 December 1906 and electrified on 1 October 1907; train service commenced four months later.

Service 
Lines S1 and S11 of the Hamburg S-Bahn stop at Landwehr station.

See also  

 Hamburger Verkehrsverbund (HVV)
 List of Hamburg S-Bahn stations

References

External links 

 Line and route network plans at hvv.de 

Hamburg S-Bahn stations
Buildings and structures in Wandsbek
Railway stations in Germany opened in 1906